The Gonzales–Rosewall rivalry was a tennis rivalry between Pancho Gonzales and Ken Rosewall, widely regarded as two of the greatest tennis players of all time. This rivalry featured some of the most acclaimed matches in tennis history, and was the most prolific tennis rivalry of all time.

Gonzales is still considered to be a candidate for the greatest tennis player of all time; he was the dominant player of the 1950s and holds the men's all-time record of being ranked world No. 1 for eight years. Rosewall succeeded Gonzales as the world's best player in 1961 and held that position either by himself or sharing it with others for six years. Rosewall was signed in 1956 by the promoter Jack Kramer, a former world No. 1 player himself, to join his small band of touring professionals in 1957. He then engaged in a round-the-world, head-to-head tour against Gonzales, the defending world champion, over the next five months, winning 26 matches but losing 50. In his 1979 autobiography Kramer included both Gonzales and Rosewall in his list of the 21 greatest players of all time. Kramer, however, initially "panicked" upon signing Rosewall.He was a cute little fellow with a dink serve, who operated mostly from the baseline. That great volley of his hadn't been developed yet. I was afraid that Gorgo [Gonzales] would eat him alive and put us out of business the rest of the way. But like a lot of people I completely underestimated Rosewall. Before their opening match in Melbourne, Kramer went to Gonzales and asked him to "carry" Rosewall, giving him a better share of the gate to gain his assent. Gonzales did try to carry out his part of the deal for a few matches, but then called it off, telling Kramer that he was no longer able to play his normal game. Kramer agreed. "It was... obvious that Rosewall was not the pushover I had feared. (In fact, Gonzales only beat him 50–26, and it was always competitive.)"<ref>Ibid. page 228</ref> Thirteen years later, in 1970, Gonzales defeated Rosewall, who was six years his junior, 6–4, 6–4, in the next-to-last match they ever played—Gonzales was 42 years old at the time and Rosewall was considered to be the co-No. 1 player in the world.

In 1961 Gonzales named Rosewall as the toughest opponent he had faced, rating him above Jack Kramer, Lew Hoad, Pancho Segura, Ted Schroeder, Frank Sedgman and Frank Parker. Gonzales added:
“Even with my tremendous service advantage I can only just edge him out on grass or wood.  On clay courts, where my service advantage is neutralised, he has the advantage over me.”

Pancho said admiringly:  “If he had my service no one would touch him.” 

Head-to-head tally
The following is a breakdown of their documented head-to-head results:

All Matches: Gonzales 117-87
World Pro Tours (1957, 1960): Gonzales 70-30
All Finals: Rosewall 8–7
Pro Slams: Rosewall 3–2
Grand Slams: 0–0
By surfaces played on, both indoors and outdoors:

Clay: Rosewall 16–11; Gonzales won the first five, Rosewall 16 of the last 21
Grass: Gonzales 24–14
Canvas: Gonzales 52–26
Carpet: Rosewall 7–4; none played before US Pro Indoor in mid-1965
Hard (including concrete but not canvas or carpet): Gonzales 11–8
Wood: Gonzales 14–13

Unknown: Gonzales 1-2

List of all matches

 (i) means it was played indoors; (O) means it was played outdoors
 The star (*) means it was most probably indoor wood, but there is a chance it was indoor hard

See also
 List of tennis rivalries
 Laver–Rosewall rivalry

Sources
 Joe McCauley, The History of Professional Tennis, London 2001
 World Tennis (The US Magazine)
 World of Tennis (Annuals edited by John Barrett)
 Marion Anthony "Tony" Trabert in Tennis de France (French magazine'')
 ATP Gonzales Rosewall Head to Head

Notes

Tennis rivalries